ADC Telecommunications was a communications company located in Eden Prairie, Minnesota, a southwest suburb of Minneapolis. It was acquired by TE Connectivity (Tyco Electronics) in December 2010 and ceased to exist as a separate entity. It vacated its Eden Prairie location in May 2011 and moved staff and resources to other locations. ADC products were sold by CommScope after it acquired the Broadband Network Solutions business unit (including ADC) from TE Connectivity in August 2015.

History

In 1935, fellow engineers Ralph Allison and Walter Lehnert were each operating business efforts out of their respective basements; Ralph Allison was building audio amplifiers and Walter Lehnert was building transformers. In the fall of 1936, the two combined their efforts to form the Audio Development Company (ADC). The company was later renamed to ADC Telecommunications, Inc.

During their first year in business, ADC built hearing aids and audiometers—a machine used for evaluating hearing acuity. Initially the audiometers were built for Maico, but in 1945 ADC began building audiometers under its own name. Additionally, by 1942, the company had designed a sophisticated audio system for the University of Minnesota, and the resulting jacks, plugs, patch cords and jackfields became the cornerstones for ADC's later entry into telecommunications.

In 1949, ADC sold its audiometer product line and Ralph Allison left the company to form a new business in California. With Walter Lehnert remaining as president of the company, ADC diversified and focused its efforts in the area of transformers and filters for power lines, military electronics, telephone jacks and plugs.

In 1961, ADC merged with Magnetic Controls Company, a manufacturer of power supplies and magnetic amplifiers with strong ties to the U.S. space program. The resulting company, ADC Magnetic Controls, had a decade of mixed success. Although transformer sales boomed during the 1960s, other new product initiatives failed to materialize. Perhaps the most significant product innovation during this period was the bantam jack, a miniaturized component that eventually became the standard for telephone circuit access and patching. Building on its growing sales of jacks and plugs in the early 1970s, ADC introduced prewired, connectorized jackfields, wired assemblies and test equipment for telephone operating companies. By 1974 the company was on solid ground, and by 1976, ADC had become the largest independent supplier of test boards in the United States.

ADC grew in 1983, when AT&T was ordered to deregulate by the federal government. By establishing the seven Regional Bell Operating Company (RBOC) carriers as independent entities, the U.S. market for telecommunications expanded by 90 percent. ADC became a supplier for the RBOCs.

ADC embarked on some acquisitions in the early 1990s, attempting to move "up the stack" in the datacom field by acquiring companies that manufactured datacom equipment.  However, their ability to find synergies between these companies proved limited and eventually ADC was forced to move away from a hardware-only strategy, broadening out into software.  This effort resulted in limited success as well, and happening about the same time as the dot-com bubble burst, caused ADC stock to plummet. Despite these ups and downs, ADC continued to survive and on July 13, 2010, the company released this announcement: "Tyco Electronics (NYSE: TEL) and ADC (Nasdaq: ADCT) announced today a definitive agreement under which Tyco Electronics will acquire ADC for $12.75 per share in cash, or an enterprise value of approximately $1.25 billion. The transaction is expected to be accretive by approximately $0.14 per share in the first full year after closing excluding acquisition-related costs."

The acquisition of ADC by TE Connectivity was completed on December 9, 2010 

On January 28, 2015, it was publicly announced that the boards of directors of both TE Connectivity and CommScope agreed for CommScope to purchase the Broadband Network Solutions business unit of TE Connectivity in an all-cash deal for US$3.0 billion.  The former ADC is a part of this business unit.  The purchase of the Broadband Network Solutions business was closed on Aug 31. 2015

Corporate acquisitions
In 1993, ADC acquired Fibermux Corp., a manufacturer of LAN Hubs and Data Multiplexers, later merging the Fibermux division with the Kentrox subsidiary.  ADC sold Kentrox to the private equity firm Platinum Equity, LLC in 2001. ADC also acquired American Lightwave Systems, a manufacturer of uncompressed video transport equipment for telecom carriers.  This division was later sold to C-COR Electronics.  In 1996, ADCT merged with ITS (Information Transmission Systems) but has since sold it off.  In 1999 ADC acquired Saville later sold to Intec Telecom Systems. In FY2005, ADC acquired Fiber Optic Network Solutions (FONS) to expand its FTTX offerings and OpenCell to enhance its wireless coverage and capacity offerings. In 2007 ADC acquired LGC Wireless to expand its portfolio of wireless coverage and capacity products and services.  In 2008, ADC expanded its market presence and manufacturing capacity in China with the acquisition of Century Man Communications.
May 1, 1997 - ADC Telecommunications Inc., Minneapolis, has signed a definitive agreement to acquire The Apex Group Inc., Columbia, MD, in a stock-for-stock purchase worth approximately $26 million. The Apex Group is a software development and information management company.

Businesses
ADC's customers were served regionally by businesses focused on telecommunications, wireless, cable, and enterprise networks. Business units within ADC developing products and services included Global Connectivity Solutions, Network Solutions and Professional Services.

References

External links

CommScope
CommScope In the News
ADC Telecommunications SEC Filings

Networking companies of the United States
Companies formerly listed on the Nasdaq
Companies based in Eden Prairie, Minnesota
Manufacturing companies based in Minnesota
Defunct companies based in Minnesota
Telecommunications equipment vendors
American companies established in 1935
Telecommunications companies established in 1935
Manufacturing companies disestablished in 2010
1935 establishments in Minnesota
2010 disestablishments in Minnesota
2010 mergers and acquisitions
American companies disestablished in 2010
Telecommunications companies disestablished in 2010